The Professional Fighters League (PFL) is an American mixed martial arts league founded by venture capitalist Donn Davis in 2017 and launched in 2018, following the acquisition and restructuring of the former World Series of Fighting (WSOF) promotion in 2017 by MMAX Investment Partners. It is the first major MMA organization in which individual athletes compete in a regular season, post-season and championship, rather than on a year-round basis.

The PFL currently puts on fights across six weight-divisions: featherweight, women's lightweight, lightweight, welterweight, light heavyweight and heavyweight. In addition to this, there is also a ‘Super Fight’ division, which isn’t defined by weight, but instead is based around the status and name value of individuals who compete in it.  The PFL's matches are held inside a 10-sided mixed martial arts cage known as the SmartCage, and adhere to the unified rules of mixed martial arts, with the exception of the prohibition of elbow strikes.

The PFL's inaugural event took place on June 7, 2018 at the Hulu Theater at Madison Square Garden in New York City, New York. At the end, each champion of the six weight classes won a championship prize of $1 million each.

History

Founding and WSOF acquisition 

The World Series of Fighting (WSOF) was formed in 2012, after signing a broadcast deal with the NBC Sports Network. Soon after WSOF's first event was announced, it would be confirmed that Bas Rutten and Michael Schiavello would serve as commentators.  
Jazz Securo was the official voice and Ring Announcer of WSOF.
The WSOF held over 35 events in multiple countries including the United States, Canada, Japan, China and the Philippines, and was best known for featuring fighters such as Justin Gaethje, Marlon Moraes and Lance Palmer.

In 2017, MMAX Investment Partners, a group of McLean, Virginia investors, which included financier Russ Ramsey, Mark Leschly, businessman Ted Leonsis, Washington Nationals' owner Mark Lerner and future Virginia governor Glenn Youngkin, acquired the assets of the WSOF. It was announced that the WSOF would be restructured as the Professional Fighters League (PFL), with owner Davis as founder and with the inaugural season taking place in 2018. After the restructuring, WSOF president and co-founder Ray Sefo joined PFL as president of fight operations. Sefo was previously a MMA fighter and a six-time Muay Thai world champion. In January 2018, former National Football League executive Peter Murray was appointed CEO of the league. That year, in its inaugural season as the PFL, the promotion introduced a league model, the first MMA promotion to do so.

2020–2021
Following a partnership with blockchain reward app Socios.com in October 2020, PFL launched a fan non-fungible token (NFT) and became the first sports league to launch such a token.
In February 2021, PFL announced a $65 million financing round which expanded the total funding to $175 million. The funding round was led by Ares Capital, Elysian Park Ventures, and Knighthead Capital.

In March 2021, Hall of Fame American football player Ray Lewis joined the PFL athlete advisory board.

In April 2021, former NFL running back Marshawn Lynch and rapper Wiz Khalifa both became PFL investors. Lynch joined the ownership group, while Khalifa serves as an advisor. That same month, DraftKings was named the first official sportsbook and daily fantasy partner of the PFL. DraftKings would sponsor the league's pre-fight shows and use their in-fighting technology and capturing real-time data for future prop bets.

In August 2021, PFL announced a long-term partnership with Legends Hospitality, with the company purchasing a minority ownership stake.

2022 - Present 
In April 2022, games publisher Rival Games signed a partnership with PFL, its first with an MMA company. The deal was intended to create a gaming community for PFL and allow fans to host tournaments. In that same month, PFL signed a deal with social platform millions.co for group/party streaming. In May 2022, PFL revealed that they completed a $30 million equity round to aid in global expansion efforts and a new Pay-per-view division. Baseball player Alex Rodriguez was involved the raise and, with Daniel Leff,  joined PFL's board of directors. That same month, Murray told daily newspaper the New York Post that PFL was coming back to New York City for its 2022 playoffs, with the first playoff held at the Hulu Theater at Madison Square Garden on August 5, 2022.  Later that month, Live Nation Entertainment signed a deal with PFL to broadcast the 2022 playoffs in the UK, as PFL planned to host playoffs in the Cardiff International Arena in Cardiff and the Copper Box Arena in London in August 2022, following a first event in New York City.

In June 2022, PFL fighter and two-time lightweight champion Kayla Harrison was nominated for an ESPY award. In July 2022, PFL announced plans for a European league, starting in 2023. The regional league will be called PFL Europe.

In January 2023, the PFL announced a new division, known as Super Fight, with events on pay-per-view, co-founded by major influencer-turned-boxer Jake Paul. Paul plans to fight twice for the PFL in 2023 while also taking the title Head of Fighter Advocacy. Super Fight participants will earn at least 50 percent of the pay-per-view revenue, significantly higher than the 20 percent earned by fighters in the UFC.

Fight format and point system 
The PFL's matches are held inside a 10-sided mixed-martial arts cage known as the SmartCage, and adhere to the unified rules of mixed martial arts, with the exception of the prohibition of elbow strikes.

A fighter who is overweight on the scale at weigh-ins will be deducted one point in the standings in the PFL's season structure and will be ineligible to win any points from that bout.

The PFL follows a point-based scoring system, consisting of outcome-based elimination, with a proprietary scoring and bonuses for an early win. Under the outcome-based scoring system, fighters compete twice during the regular season. Four fighters with the most points in their respective divisions advance to the playoffs. Fights are three-round bouts, and the winners are awarded three points. Bonus points are awarded for knockouts and submission wins. If a fighter finishes a bout in the first round, they are awarded three bonus points. Second and third-round finishes are awarded two and one points, respectively. If a fighter wins in the first round, they are awarded six total points. A second-round finish awards them five total points, and a third-round finish awards them four total points. The loser of the fight is not awarded any points. If a fight ends in a draw, both fighters are awarded a single point. For example, if a fighter wins a fight in the first round, the fighter will receive six total points. A win by decision doesn't earn bonus points.

Win in any round automatically: 3 points
 Bonus points for a finish (KO or submission)
 Round 1: 3 points
 Round 2: 2 points
 Round 3: 1 point

In the playoffs, the player with the most points is ranked number one and will face number four. The number two and three ranked players will face each other. The semi-finals are three-round bouts. The winners of these bouts will face each other in a five-round championship fight for a $1 million prize.

In 2021, PFL changed the playoff structure, the top four fighters per division after the regular season will make the playoffs, a number down from the eight who made the playoffs in men's divisions in previous seasons. In the women's lightweight division, the top four fighters make the playoffs, similar to the 2019 rules. The four fighters who make the playoffs advance directly to the semifinals in each division. There are  no quarterfinals, nor a situation where a fighter must win twice in a single night.

PFL Challenger Series 

PFL Challenger Series is an American mixed martial arts series. Young and up-and-coming male and female MMA fighters will compete for a slot in the PFL tournament season and a chance at $1 million. Each week, the PFL Challenger Series will consist of a celebrity guest panel featuring personalities in film, athletics and sports. In the 2021 debut airing of the PFL Challenger Series, the celebrity guest panel included NFL stars Ray Lewis and Todd Gurley and entertainers Jeremy Piven and Wiz Khalifa.

The inaugural PFL Challenger Series streamed on FuboTV and Fubo Sports Network from February 2022 to April 2022.

PFL Europe 
Starting in 2023 PFL Europe will feature the top emerging European MMA fighters, and will be broadcast during prime local hours with all events staged in Europe.

Roster 

For each season, the PFL roster begins with 72 fighters in six weight classes: five men’s weight classes and one women’s weight class. PFL additionally signs fighters to development contracts from the PFL Challenger Series. These fighters occasionally appear as alternates in the league season or as showcase fights opening the league events.

For the 2018 season, the PFL roster included 72 fighters in six weight classes. The 2019 roster included 68 fighters in six weight classes, including a new Women's Lightweight division.

Champions

2018 World Champions

2019 World Champions

2021 World Champions

2022 World Champions

Fighter signing 
In November 2020, two-time Olympic gold medalist and #2 pound-for-pound women's boxer Claressa Shields signed a three-year contract with the Professional Fighters League to compete in the women's lightweight division. Shields plans to compete in both boxing and MMA. In December 2020, former UFC lightweight champion Anthony Pettis joined the Professional Fighters League ahead of the 2021 regular season, departing from the UFC promotion where he fought for nearly a decade.

Events

Scheduled events

Event history

2018

The inaugural season had 72 fighters in six weight-classes, competing in seven regular season events on Thursday nights in June, July and August. The top eight in each weight-class faced off in bracket-style, single elimination playoff fights on Saturday nights in October. The PFL 2018 season concluded on December 31, 2018 with six championship bouts back-to-back with a $10 million prize pool. The first season was headlined by a fight between Andre Harrison about Jumabieke Tuerxun and featured bouts in the featherweight and heavyweight divisions.

In 2018, the seven regular-season events were held at the Hulu Theater at Madison Square Garden, the Chicago Theatre, GWU Smith Center, Nassau Coliseum and Ocean Resort Casino. The playoff events was held at the Ernest N. Morial Convention Center, the Long Beach Arena, and the St. Elizabeths East Entertainment and Sports Arena. The championship event was held at the Hulu Theater at Madison Square Garden.

2019

The PFL 2019 regular season consisted of six weight classes and six events spanning from May to August. Playoffs consisted of three events and the season culminates with the Championship Event on New Year's Eve 2019.

2020
The PFL 2020 season was postponed due to the COVID-19 pandemic. As a measure to relieve the financial pressure of the athletes, the organization decided to hand out monthly stipends to the contracted fighters. Reactions to the stipend were mixed, with fighter Lance Palmer complaining about the amount of the stipend and with fighter Natan Schulte applauding the monthly stipend. According to multiple fighters, the stipend was $1,000 per month.

In September 2020, PFL introduced a new series called "Inside the Season," produced in partnership with the United States Marine Corp, that detailed the journey fighters go on through training, regular season, playoffs and championships. The series is narrated by actor John C. McGinley and airs on ESPNews.

2021

Two-time Olympic gold medalist and top pound-for-pound women's boxer Claressa Shields signed a three-year contract with the Professional Fighters League to compete in the Women's Lightweight division and former UFC lightweight champ Anthony Pettis who joined the Professional Fighters League ahead of the 2021 regular season.

PFL's 2021 roster included 60 fighters competing across six weight classes. The late additions to the season were the welterweights Gleison Tibau, Alexey Kunchenko and Jason Ponet, featherweights Chris Wade and Anthony Dizy, women's lightweights Kaitlin Young and Taylor Guardado and light heavyweight Nick Roehrick.

In December 2021, PFL announced a multi-year partnership for its new PFL Challenger Series with streaming television provider fuboTV on its Fubo Sports Network. Set to debut in February 2022, the new event will see fighters competing for a chance to earn a PFL contract and will incorporate a celebrity judging panel, a fan vote, sports betting and gamification.

2022

Broadcast
On January 29, 2018, the League announced it had reached a multi-platform distribution deal for the inaugural 2018 season with NBC Sports Group and Facebook. Within the United States, NBC Sports Group established a live Thursday night PFL franchise, presenting seven regular-season live events in prime time exclusively on NBCSN beginning June 7, 2018, through the end of August 2018. Events televised by NBCSN also streamed on NBCSports.com and the NBC Sports app. All regular season events had encore telecasts on NBCSN later the same night. Outside the U.S., Facebook streamed up to six hours of live coverage for each event. Facebook also opened each event with a live 30-minute pre-fight show and closed each with a live 30-minute post-fight show. In the U.S., fans were able to watch the first three hours of undercard coverage of each event on Facebook prior to NBCSN's presentation of the main bouts.

Beginning in February 2019, the PFL's events are broadcast by ESPN in the United States and TSN in Canada. PFL events and playoff matches air on ESPN+ and ESPN2, with the Championship Event on New Year's Eve airing exclusively on ESPN2 and ESPN Deportes.

The PFL international distribution is handled by combat sports rights distributor Fighting Spirit. PFL airs on Claro Sports in Hispanic America, Combate in Brazil, MMA TV in the United Kingdom, MMA TV in Nordic countries, Match TV and Boets TV in Russia, JSBC in China, beIN Sports in the Middle East and Northern Africa, and ESPN in sub-Saharan Africa.

In August 2020, the PFL launched an over the top (OTT) platform via its mobile app. In October 2021, the PFL signed a distribution deal with sports media company Wave.tv.

As of 2021, the PFL is broadcast in 160 countries, through media partners like ESPN in the United States, Globo in Brazil, Bild in Germany, RMC Sports in France, Eurosport in India, and Telesport in Russia. In January 2022, it was announced that PFL and ESPN struck a multi-year contract extension for broadcasting rights in the United States.

In October 2022, the PFL is broadcast by Fast Sports HD in Pakistan

Broadcast team 
PFL's 2018 broadcast team for live events and pre- and post-event shows included Randy Couture, Bas Rutten, Yves Edwards, Caroline Pearce and Todd Harris. Harris provided play-by-play while Couture provided color commentary. Rutten and Pearce conducted pre- and post-fight interviews and Edwards offered video breakdowns and fight analysis.

The 2019 broadcast team for live events and pre- and post-event shows included 2018 PFL light heavyweight champion Sean O'Conell, Randy Couture, Caroline Pearce and former UFC lightweight Yves Edwards, with former WWE ring announcer Lilian Garcia as in-cage announcer.

The 2021 broadcast team included Randy Couture, Kenny Florian, Sean O'Connell, Lillian Garcia and Chael Sonnen. The 2022 broadcast team includes Couture, Florian, O'Connell and Garcia.

References

External links
 
 PFL event results at Tapology
 WSOF event results at Sherdog

 
Mixed martial arts organizations
2012 establishments in Washington, D.C.
Sports leagues established in 2012